Jorun Solheim (born 18 November 1944) is a Norwegian social anthropologist and women's studies academic, whose work is centered on gender, culture and modernity.

She was lecturer in social anthropology at the University of Oslo from 1971 to 1983, Researcher at the Work Research Institute from 1981 to 2001 and Professor at the Centre for Women's Studies at the University of Oslo from 1994 to 1999. She is currently Senior Researcher at the Norwegian Institute of Social Research. In 2007, she became editor-in-chief of Tidsskrift for kjønnsforskning. She has a mag.art. (i.e. PhD) degree in social anthropology from 1970.

Works
Kjønn og modernitet, 2007
Den usynlige hånd?, 2002
Den åpne kroppen, 1998

References

Social anthropologists
Feminist studies scholars
Academic staff of the University of Oslo
1944 births
Living people
Norwegian anthropologists
Norwegian feminists
Norwegian women anthropologists
Postmodern feminists
Work Research Institute people